Role Models is a 2017 Indian Malayalam-language romantic comedy-drama film written and directed by Rafi. The film stars Fahadh Faasil, Namitha Pramod, Vinayakan, Vinay Forrt, and Sharafudheen . Role Models was shot in various locations of Goa and Dubai. The film released on 25 June 2017 all over Kerala.

Plot
The film opens with Gautham being an asocial man, very different from his college days. His father asks Gautham's college friends Rexxie and Jyothish to help him. Coming to know that Gautham insulted a girl during a date at the public library for which her father called him gay as he wasn't interested in females, the two go to his office. But Gautham treats them rather formally. Then they see his boss shouting at him and he listens to it patiently, which they found difficult to believe because he was unlike the Gautham they had heard of. They find out that he isn't gay.

Their college days are revealed showing Gautham being a very social person. He was the lead singer of a band named 'Role Models' which consisted of Shreya,Jyothish, Rexxie and Subhan, a flirt. They were best friends and everyone liked them but Gautham's parents disliked their son being with them. Then it is revealed that Gautham's parents gave a complaint to the principal with Gautham's signature which Gautham signed when he was drunk. As a result, the three were expelled. Gautham tries to explain to them that it wasn't him who gave the complaint and that they all knew each other's secrets and they should not break up. But Subhan asks him in anger why he kept his love affair a secret and the others are surprised. Eventually, they are separated.

Rexxie and Jyothish tell Gautham that Subhan was having cancer and that he wants to meet Gautham which was a lie.
Gautham goes with them to Subhan's place. Subhan has become a football player and is still a bachelor. Rexxie asks with whom Gautham had a love affair and Subhan tells that it was Christy, a tomboy who they all know. Then it is shown that Christy had written a love letter to Gautham which was caught by the principal.

The three of them bring back Christy, who is getting married in a month. But Gautham is unhappy to see her and reveals that it was he who had given the letter to the principal. Hearing Gautham's answer she tries to beat him. Then he reveals that he used to like Shreya and not Christy. Reuniting with Shreya and solving issues between Shreya and Gautham's parents form the rest of the plot.

Cast 

 Fahadh Faasil as Gautham
 Namitha Pramod as Shreya
 Vinayakan as Jyothish Narayanan
 Vinay Forrt as Subahan Abdul Khader
 Sharaf U Dheen as Rexxie/Pappachan George
 Srinda Arhaan as Christy
 Aju Varghese as Kiran (voice only) cameo
 Renji Panicker as Shekhar Gautham's Father
 Siddique as Shreya's Father
 Seetha as Gautham's Mother
 Suraj Venjarammoodu as News reporter
 Dileesh Pothan as Gautham's boss
 Rafi as Shreya's uncle
 Bibin George as Beggar 
 Aswathi Menon as Lucy
 Rithu Manthra as Gautham's workmate 
 Anjali Nair as Natasha, social activist 
 Balachandran Chullikkadu as College Principal . Dr. Abraham Mathew
 Chembil Ashokan as Joseph
 Sadiq as Ravi
 Sasankan Mayyanad
 Harishree Ashokan as Ramanan (cameo appearance)
 Cochin Haneefa as Gangadharan (photo prescene)

Reception 
The film garnered generally positive reviews praising it as a fun filled family entertainer. Fahadh Faasil, Vinaayakan, Sharaf U Dheen and Vinay Forrt made a combo of youth and it includes a comic first half and an engaging second half. The film also includes Harishree Ashokan in a guest role as "Ramanan", playing the same character he played in Punjabi House, which is a popular troll character in social media.

References

External links 
 

2010s Malayalam-language films
Indian romantic comedy-drama films
Films shot in Goa
Films shot in Dubai
2017 romantic comedy-drama films
2017 films
2017 comedy-drama films